Oosterbroek is a former municipality in the province of Groningen in the Netherlands.

The municipality of Oosterbroek was created in 1965, when the municipalities of Noordbroek and Zuidbroek were merged. In 1990, the municipalities of Meeden and Muntendam were merged with Oosterbroek, which was renamed to Menterwolde a year later.

References

External links 
 

Former municipalities of Groningen (province)
Midden-Groningen